Electoral district of Eastern Suburbs was an electoral district of the Legislative Assembly in the Australian state of Victoria. 
It included the eastern Melbourne suburbs of Kew, Camberwell, Balwyn, Hartwell, Caulfield East and Malvern East.

The district was created after the Electoral district of Boroondara, which included some of the same area, was abolished in 1889.

Members for Eastern Suburbs

References

Eastern Suburbs, Electoral district of
1889 establishments in Australia
1904 disestablishments in Australia